Bahujan Samaj Party Kainth , a splinter group of Bahujan Samaj Party in Punjab. BSP(K) was founded on 30 October 2004. BSP(K) is led by Satnam Singh Kainth (ex: MP and ex-president of Democratic Bahujan Samaj Morcha). Kainth had re-joined BSP ahead of the 2004 Lok Sabha elections, but was later expelled.

References

Political parties in Punjab, India
Political schisms
2004 establishments in Punjab, India
Political parties established in 2004